Dick Johnson (December 1, 1925 – January 10, 2010) was an American big band clarinetist, best known for his work with the Artie Shaw Band.   From 1983 until his death he was the leader of the Artie Shaw Orchestra.

Born Richard Brown Johnson in Brockton, Massachusetts, he also played the alto saxophone and  flute. Johnson worked with Frank Sinatra, the Swing Shift Orchestra, Dizzy Gillespie and Tony Bennett.

Johnson died in Boston, Massachusetts after a short illness, aged 84.

Discography 
 1956: Music for Swinging Moderns (EmArcy)
 1957: Most Likely (Riverside) with Dave McKenna, Wilbur Ware, Philly Joe Jones
 1957: At Newport (Verve) with Eddie Costa
 1979: Dick Johnson Plays Alto Sax & Flute & Soprano Sax & Clarinet (Concord) with Dave McKenna, Bob Maize, Jake Hanna
 1980: Live at Bovi's (Argonne) with Duke Belaire Jazz Orchestra
 1980: Spider's Blues (Concord) with Dave McKenna
 1981: Swing Shift (Concord)
 1982: Everybody Eats When They Come to My House (Soap) with Razmataz
 2004: Artie's Choice! and the Naturals
 2006: Star Dust & Beyond: A Tribute to Artie Shaw

References

1925 births
2010 deaths
American jazz clarinetists
American jazz flautists
American jazz saxophonists
American male saxophonists
Musicians from Boston
Musicians from Brockton, Massachusetts
Riverside Records artists
Jazz musicians from Massachusetts
American male jazz musicians
20th-century American saxophonists
20th-century flautists